Habibabad (also Romanized as Ḩabībābād) is a village in Emamzadeh Aqaali Abbas Rural District, Emamzadeh District, Natanz County, Isfahan Province, Iran. At the 2006 census, its population was 23, in 6 families.

References 

Populated places in Natanz County